Sally Fox is a passenger-only ferry built for the King County Water Taxi. The boat began operating on the Vashon route in April 2015, replacing two leased boats. The vessel was named for Sally Fox, a Vashon Island activist who fought for passenger ferry service to the island.

References

External links
 King County Water Taxi Homepage
 Sally Fox Information (King County Water Taxi)

Ferries of Washington (state)
Transportation in King County, Washington
2014 ships
Water transport in Seattle
Ships built in Bellingham, Washington